Fly High, Fly Low is a 1957 picture book written and illustrated by Don Freeman. The book tells the story of two birds whose nest gets taken down. The book was a recipient of a 1958 Caldecott Honor for its illustrations.

References

1957 children's books
American picture books
Caldecott Honor-winning works